General elections were held in Fiji in 1871 to elect members of the new Legislative Assembly.

Background
In June 1871 King Cakobau created a House of Delegates, with elections taking place soon afterwards. The House passed amendments to the constitution, which provided for a Privy Council consisting of a high chief from each province, the governors of provincial councils and members of the cabinet, and an elected Legislative Assembly composed of Europeans. Writs for the elections to the Legislative Assembly were issued on 1 August and the House of Delegates ended its final session on 23 August.

Electoral system
The Legislative Assembly had 28 elected members, elected from 21 constituencies.

Results

Aftermath
Following the elections, the Assembly was due to meet for the first time on 1 November, but this was postponed until 3 November after strong winds prevented Cakobau from attending. Former mayor of Melbourne James Stewart Butters was elected speaker. Seven of the elected members decided to go into opposition and formed the Constitution Party with Robert Wilson Hamilton as chairman.

Fresh elections were due to be held in 1873 with Fijians allowed to vote. However, following protests by Europeans, the elections were cancelled. The next elections did not take place until 1905.

References

1871 elections in Oceania
1871 in Fiji
1871